Joachim Ernst, Duke of Anhalt (11 January 1901 – 18 February 1947) was the last ruler of the Duchy of Anhalt.

Biography
He was born in Dessau, the son of Duke Eduard of Anhalt (1861–1918) and Princess Louise Charlotte of Saxe-Altenburg (1873–1953), the daughter of Prince Moritz of Saxe-Altenburg.

He succeeded his father as Duke of Anhalt on 13 September 1918. However, due to his age, his uncle Prince Aribert of Anhalt was appointed regent. His brief reign came to an end on 12 November 1918, with his uncle abdicating in his name following the German revolution. The duchy became the Free State of Anhalt and is today part of the state of Saxony-Anhalt.

Ernst joined the ruling Nazi Party in 1939.  He died at the Buchenwald concentration camp after World War II as a prisoner of the Soviet Union, when it was called NKVD special camp Nr. 2.

Following his death, the headship of the Ducal House of Anhalt was disputed between his elder son, Prince Friedrich, and brother Prince Eugen.

Marriages and children
In Ballenstedt Castle on 3 March 1927, Joachim Ernst married firstly Elisabeth Strickrodt (Plauen, 3 September 1903 – Berlin-Zehlendorf, 5 January 1971), a daughter of an opera singer. She was created Countess of Askanien, but they were divorced in 1929, without issue.

In Ballenstedt Castle on 15 October 1929, Joachim Ernst married secondly Editha "Edda" Charlotte Wilhelmine Marwitz von Stephani (Düsseldorf, 20 August 1905 – Garmisch-Partenkirchen, 22 February 1986), natural daughter of Wilhelm Horn by Irmgard Klara Franziska Marwitz, married firstly and divorced from Maximilian, Edler von Rogister, who was adopted as an adult by Bertha von Stephani, reputedly for a payment of 10,000 marks, in order to improve her social standing. They had five children: 
Marie Antoinette Elisabeth Alexandra Irmgard Edda Charlotte (14 July 1930 – 22 March 1993), married firstly 1957 (div. 1968) Karl-Heinz Guttmann and had one son, and married secondly 1974 (div. 1976) Max Riederer. 
Joachim Ernst Guttmann (b. 1963), who married in 2006 Bettina Pahn. They had one child:
Leonhardt Held (b. 31 July 2008)
Anna Luise Marie Friederike Elisabeth Alice (26 March 1933 – 1 November 2003), married 1966 (div. 1970) Thomas Birch (b. 27 September 1927, New York City, USA). They have one son:
James Anhalt-Birch (b. 12 April 1968, New York City, USA). 
Leopold Friedrich Franz Sieghard Hubertus Erdmann (11 April 1938 – 9 October 1963).
Edda Adelheid Antoinette Emma Elisabeth (born 30 January 1940), married 1974 Albert Darboven.
Eduard Julius Ernst August Erdmann (born 3 December 1941), married 1980 (div. 2014) Corinne Krönlein.

Honours and awards

Dynastic honours 
 House of Ascania
  Sovereign Knight Grand Cross with Collar of the Ducal Order of Albert the Bear.

Nongovernmental organizations 
 Slovakia, Servare et Manere
  Memorial Medal of Tree of Peace, Special class with rubies, In memoriam (January 11, 2021).

Gallery

Ancestry

References

External links
 House of Anhalt-Askanien  

1901 births
1947 deaths
House of Ascania
German royalty
Princes of Anhalt
Dukes of Anhalt
German people of French descent
People who died in NKVD special camp Nr. 2

Nazis who died in prison custody
Royalty in the Nazi Party